Trou-du-Nord is an arrondissement in the Nord-Est department of Haiti. As of 2015, the population was 115,000 inhabitants. Postal codes in the Trou-du-Nord Arrondissement start with the number 23.

The arrondissement consists of the following communes:
 Trou-du-Nord
 Sainte-Suzanne
 Terrier-Rouge
 Caracol

References

Arrondissements of Haiti
Nord-Est (department)